= Jerry Woodard =

- Born: Jerry Eugene Woodard; May 25, 1941; Anniston, Alabama, U.S.
- Died: August 9, 1980 (aged 39) St. Simons Island, Georgia, U.S.
- Genres: Rockabilly, rock and roll, country, soul, blues
- Occupations: Singer, guitarist, songwriter, radio host
- Years active: 1950s–1980
- Labels: Fad, Reed, RCA Victor, Heart, Dial, Argo, Chantain

Jerry Eugene Woodard (May 25, 1941 – August 9, 1980) was an American rockabilly singer, guitarist, songwriter, and radio host from Alabama. Active primarily during the 1950s and 1960s, Woodard recorded rockabilly, country, soul, blues, and pop music for labels including Fad, Reed, RCA Victor, Heart, Dial, Argo, and Chantain.

Woodard was posthumously inducted into the Birmingham Record Collectors Hall of Fame in 2010.

== Early life ==
Woodard was born in Anniston, Alabama. He grew up in a musical family. His father, a minister, played guitar and banjo, while his mother played guitar and piano and reportedly taught guitarist Jerry Reed during his youth.

During the early 1950s, Woodard's family moved to Yerington, Nevada, where he and his brother won a talent contest performing the song "Mansion in the Sky". The family later returned to Alabama and settled in Tuscumbia.

== Career ==
Woodard began performing professionally in Alabama during the 1950s. Alongside his brother Wayne Woodard, he hosted a rock and roll radio show on WHTB-AM in Talladega. At the station he met musician Bobby Mizzell, with whom he began recording music.

In 1956, Woodard and Mizzell relocated to Birmingham, Alabama to work on television and radio programs including the Country Boy Eddie Show and The Tom York Morning Show. Woodard also hosted the WBRC-sponsored program Live from Big Hearted Eddie's.

Woodard founded the Fad record label and recorded several singles during the late 1950s. His recordings with Jerry Reed attracted the attention of producer Chet Atkins at RCA Victor.

In 1959, Woodard formed the group The Esquires with musicians including Barry Beckett, Ronnie Eades, Johnny Carter, Dinky Harris, and Doc Watson. The group performed regularly at Birmingham venues including Pappy's Club and the Allstate Club.

Woodard moved to Pensacola, Florida in 1961 and performed at the Sahara Club before opening his own venue, the Cock Rouge Club. After the venue burned down, he reopened it as the Flaming Cock Rouge Club.

During the late 1960s, Woodard returned to Birmingham before relocating to St. Simons Island, Georgia after accepting a long-term performance booking there. He later opened a nightclub called the Gilded Cage.

Woodard struggled with alcoholism during the 1970s and died in 1980 at age 39.

== Style and legacy ==
Writers and collectors have described Woodard as a versatile vocalist capable of performing rockabilly, soul, blues, novelty songs, country music, ballads, and spiritual music.

In 2022, the electronic music publication Frequency State covered a remix of Woodard's song "Heaven in My Soul" by American Studies, describing the original recording as a "gospel-soul obscurity".

== Discography ==
=== Selected singles ===
- "Six Long Weeks" / "Blue Broken Heart" (1958)
- "Downbeat" / "Our Love and Romance" (1958)
- "Who's Gonna Rock My Baby" / "Don't Make Me Lonely" (1958)
- "You Just Wait" / "New Love" (1960)
- "Speedway Rock" / "Modified-Sportsman Blues" (1961)
